The 1996 Albany Firebirds season was the seventh season for the Albany Firebirds. They finished the 1996 Arena Football League season 10–4 and finished the season with a loss in the semifinals of the playoffs to the Iowa Barnstormers.

Schedule

Regular season

Playoffs
The Firebirds were awarded the No. 4 seed in the AFL playoffs.

Standings

Awards

References

Indiana Firebirds seasons
1996 Arena Football League season
Albany Firebirds Season, 1996